Kalle Stropp, Grodan Boll och deras vänner is a 1956 Swedish live-action/stop-motion feature film directed by after an original script by Thomas Funck, using Funck's already well-established characters. It was followed by a shorter animated film in 1987, Kalle Stropp och Grodan Boll räddar Hönan. This is the first time since before 1987 where a Kalle Stropp production features voice acting by others than only Funck himself, only with the exception of children that had participated in other productions as well.

External links 

Swedish animated films
1956 films
Films based on radio series
1950s Swedish-language films
Swedish children's films
1950s Swedish films